Robert Arkadyevich Bitarov (born 23 March 1976) is a Russian former professional footballer.

Club career
He made his debut in the Russian Premier League in 1996 for FC Alania Vladikavkaz. He played 3 games in the UEFA Cup for FC Alania Vladikavkaz in 1996/97 and 2000/01 seasons.

Honours
 Russian Premier League runner-up: 1996 (played in the "golden match" that decided the championship).

References

1976 births
Sportspeople from Vladikavkaz
Living people
Russian footballers
Russia under-21 international footballers
Association football midfielders
FC Spartak Vladikavkaz players
PFC Spartak Nalchik players
FC Dynamo Stavropol players
Russian expatriate footballers
Expatriate footballers in Kazakhstan
Russian Premier League players
Russian expatriate sportspeople in Kazakhstan